This is a list of all military equipment used by the nationalists during the Spanish Civil War.

Weapons 

 List of Spanish Civil War weapons of the Nationalists

Aircraft 

 List of aircraft of Nationalist Spain in the Spanish Civil War

Ships 

 List of Classes of Spanish Nationalist ships of the Spanish Civil War

Spanish Nationalist military equipment
Spanish Nationalist of the Spanish Civil War